The Marriage Market is a 1923 American silent romantic comedy film directed by Edward LeSaint and starring Pauline Garon, Jack Mulhall, and Alice Lake.

Plot
As described in a film magazine review, mischievous pranks lead to the expulsion of Theodora Bland from a young woman's fashionable academy. She aids Dora Smith, who is escaping from a reform school, and later impersonates her in the home of novelist Roland Carruthers. The latter hides her from the Sheriff. Theodora's relatives endeavor to force her into an unwelcome marriage. After various adventures, she defeats their schemes and weds Roland.

Cast

Production
A historical sequence in the film reproduces the scene depicted in the 1875 painting The Babylonian Marriage Market by Edwin Long, which was also done in the Babylonian story of Intolerance (1916).

References

Bibliography
 Jeanine Basinger (2013). I Do and I Don't: A History of Marriage in the Movies. Knopf Doubleday Publishing Group.

External links

1923 films
1923 comedy films
Silent American comedy films
Films directed by Edward LeSaint
American silent feature films
1920s English-language films
American black-and-white films
Columbia Pictures films
1920s American films